Pavel Medvedev (born September 8, 1989) is a Russian professional ice hockey player who is currently playing with HK Almaty in the Kazakhstan Vyschaya Liga.

References

External links

1989 births
Living people
Russian ice hockey centres
Sportspeople from Penza